Taipei Broadcasting Station or Radio Taipei (TBS) is a government owned radio station in the Republic of China.  It has been in operation since 7 July 1961 under the direction of the Department of Information and Tourism, Taipei City Government. It is located in Taipei City, Taiwan directly across from the Taipei Fine Arts Museum.

History
In 1961, the station's original purpose was City Civil Defense Radio (民防廣播電台) broadcasting under the control of the Taiwan Garrison Command to coordinate air defense against a People's Liberation Army attack. Later, in 1972 the station was renamed Taipei City Civil Defense Radio (台北市民防廣播電台) and came under control of the Taipei City Government. In 1977, Taipei City Government renamed the station Taipei City Government Radio (台北市市政廣播電台).

Organizational structure
 Programming Section
 Engineering Section
 General Affairs Section
 Accounting Office
 Personnel Office

Listening frequency
The station's coverage includes Taipei, Hsinchu, Taoyuan, Keelung, Yilan, and other places.
AM 1134
FM 93.1

See also
 Media in Taiwan

External links
 Broadcasting Station

References

Chinese-language radio stations
Mandarin-language radio stations
Radio stations in Taiwan
Radio stations established in 1961
Mass media in Taipei
1961 establishments in Taiwan
Public broadcasting in Taiwan